José Manuel Bermúdez García (born 22 February 1958) is a Spanish rower. He competed at the 1980, 1984, 1988 and the 1992 Summer Olympics.

References

1958 births
Living people
Spanish male rowers
Olympic rowers of Spain
Rowers at the 1980 Summer Olympics
Rowers at the 1984 Summer Olympics
Rowers at the 1988 Summer Olympics
Rowers at the 1992 Summer Olympics
Sportspeople from Vigo